Hellyers Road is a whisky distillery in Burnie, Tasmania. Founded in 1997 by a group of dairy farmers, it takes its name from a road surveyed in 1827 by explorer Henry Hellyer. In 2010, Hellyers Road was recognised by the Malt Whisky Association of Australia for producing the nation's best single malt, and in 2013 Hellyers Road Pinot Noir Finish was voted ‘Best New World Whisky’ from a series of blind tastings conducted at the Whisky Live fair in Paris.
Hellyers Road Distillery has been rated in the Top Ten Value for Money whiskies in the world, placing it alongside some of the world's biggest mass producing spirits brands.

Hellyers Road quickly became the largest distillery in Tasmania by 2012. 

By 2015, the distillery had become the largest selling locally crafted boutique distillery in Australia.

In 2021, the distillery won Best Australian Single Malt at the prestigious World Whisky Awards for the Henry Legacy Freestone Cove Single Malt. 

In 2022, the distillery again was recognised by the World Whisky Awards, winning the Best 12 Year Old and Under category as well as Best Australian Single Malt in the 13 Year Old and Over category, with the Hellyers Road 15 Year Old Slightly Peated Single Malt. The same expression from the distillery's previous releases also won Best Australian Peated whisky in the previous year. 

Australian markets include:
Australian Capital Territory, New South Wales, Northern Territory, Queensland, South Australia, Tasmania, Victoria, Western Australia. 
International markets - Hellyers Road Distillery Single Malt Whiskies are currently sold in over 20 countries around the world, including Denmark, France, Germany, Italy, Japan, Norway, Singapore, Spain, Sweden, United Kingdom and the United States.

Current products
 Anniversary Series - 18 Years Old
 Masters Series - Original - American Oak Cask - 17 Years Old
 Masters Series - American Oak Cask - Peated 14 Years Old
 The Original - 15 Years Old
 The Original - 12 Years Old
 The Original - 10 Years Old
 The Original - 7 Years Old
 Slightly Peated - 15 Years Old
 Slightly Peated - 10 Year Old
 Peated
 American Oak Pinot Noir Cask Finish
 Rare Port Cask 
 Twin Oak
 Select Cask Series - American Oak & Port Cask
 Sherry Cask - 7 Years Old
 Whisky Cream Original/coffee/hazelnut
 Henry's Legacy - Freestone Cove
 Henry's Legacy - Levens Gateway

See also

References

Notes

External links
 Hellyers Road website

Australian distilled drinks
Australian vodkas
Australian whisky
Australian companies established in 1997
Distilleries in Australia
Food and drink companies established in 1997